Gulkader Senturk (born 8 January 1996) is a Turkish judoka. She competed in the women's 48 kg event at the 2020 Summer Olympics held in Tokyo, Japan.

She is the bronze medallist of the 2021 Judo Grand Slam Antalya in the -48 kg category.

She competed in the women's 48 kg event at the 2022 Mediterranean Games held in Oran, Algeria.

References

External links
 

1996 births
Living people
Turkish female judoka
Judoka at the 2019 European Games
European Games competitors for Turkey
Judoka at the 2020 Summer Olympics
Olympic judoka of Turkey
Competitors at the 2022 Mediterranean Games
Mediterranean Games competitors for Turkey
21st-century Turkish women